The Libero-Tarifverbund is a Swiss tariff network covering the canton of Bern and the southwestern part of the canton of Solothurn. It was established in December 2004 from the merger of the Bäre-Abi and Frosch-Abo tariff networks. The Zig-Zag network merged into Libero in 2014.

The network is divided into three types of zones:

 Yellow: single-trip, multi-trip, day tickets, and subscriptions (monthly and annual) are valid
 Blue: shared with neighboring tariff associations; Libero tickets are valid for travel in or out of these zones and into yellow zones, but not for travel within the zones
 Green: only subscriptions are valid; most such zones are in the Bernese Oberland

Partners 
Libero partners with 28 operators:

 Aare Seeland mobil
 Aufzug Matte-Plattform (operates the )
 Automobilverkehr Frutigen-Adelboden
 Bergbahn Lauterbrunnen-Mürren
 
 Bernese Oberland Railway
 BERNMOBIL
 BLS AG
 
 
 
 Chemins de fer du Jura
 Compagnie Chemin de fer Montreux-Oberland Bernois
 
 Grindelwald Bus
 Gurten Funicular
 Meiringen-Innertkirchen-Bahn
 Marzili Funicular
 Niederhornbahn
 PostBus Switzerland
 Regionalverkehr Bern-Solothurn
 
 Swiss Federal Railways
 STI Bus
 Transports publics Fribourgeois
 Verkehrsbetriebe Biel/Transports publics biennois
 Wengernalpbahn
 Zentralbahn

References

External links 
 

Transport in the canton of Bern
Transport in the canton of Solothurn